José Carlos Borunda Zaragoza (born 22 February 1971) is a Mexican politician from the National Action Party. From 2000 to 2003 he served as Deputy of the LVIII Legislature of the Mexican Congress representing Chihuahua.

References

1971 births
Living people
Politicians from Chihuahua (state)
National Action Party (Mexico) politicians
21st-century Mexican politicians
Harvard Kennedy School alumni
Boston College alumni
Deputies of the LVIII Legislature of Mexico
Members of the Chamber of Deputies (Mexico) for Chihuahua (state)